MKU is headquartered in Kanpur, Uttar Pradesh, India. The company is a manufacturer of optronics devices like night vision binoculars and monoculars, personal and platform armour solutions including as ballistic helmets, armour inserts, bulletproof vests, Ballistic Shields & Briefcases for military, paramilitary, homeland security, police & Special Forces with a customer base in over 100 countries. 

MKU was set up in 1985 to build fibre-reinforced plastic products for the Indian Army. It now provides protection to over 30 lakh (3 million) soldiers and 3000 plus platforms. Its products are used by 230 forces in over 100 countries worldwide including the United Nations and NATO.

History

The company started off with the manufacturing of locks. In 1985, M Kumar Udyog was founded for manufacturing and supply of defence specific requirements of the Indian Army, with its first lot of FRP helmets being shipped out in 1989.

By 1993 footwear manufacturing unit was commissioned. The company further diversified in 1997 and entered into plywood manufacturing business. Subsequently, a separate manufacturing unit was set up for catering to the growing demand of plywood in India. In the same year a bitumen manufacturing plant was commissioned for supplies to the emerging road construction requirements of India.

During the Kargil war of 1999, fought between India and Pakistan, the Indian Ministry of Defence realised the acute need of ballistic protection due to the high casualties amongst Indian soldiers, leading to MKU entering the bulletproof protection market. It made its first commercial international sale in 2003.

Management

Manoj Gupta is the chairman of MKU, his brother, Neeraj Gupta, heads the international business team, while the third brother, Anurag Gupta, looks after the domestic operations. Neeraj Gupta is the managing director of MKU Limited. He started the armour business of the company.

Technology

MKU has its centres of research & development in India and Germany that develop ballistic protection technologies for the company. Additionally it has its own In house Ballistic testing laboratory in Germany which can conduct ballistic testing up to STANAG Level IV including various other prevalent testing standards, globally. It recently launched a new technology which it terms as the 6th generation ballistic protection technology by the name "GEN-6" offering a substantial reduction in the weight and thickness of personal body armour by 40% and 30% respectively.

MKU's Mukut combat helmets are manufactured using its RHT (Reduced Helmet Trauma) technology which provides protection from bullets and fragments and reduces head and skull injuries. More importantly, it reduces the resultant trauma, arising due to BABT (Behind Armour Blunt Trauma), by over 40 per cent as compared to standard conventional composite helmets, according to the tests conducted by HP White Laboratory, USA.

The company has recently been contracted by the Government of India to manufacture and supply 1.59 lakh ballistic helmets to the Indian Army. The deal is estimated to be worth ₹170-180 crore. It's the first time in the last two decades that the Army has placed such a big order for helmets with an aim to enhance the fighting capability of its soldiers and provide them better protection on the battlefield.

The existing helmets have serious limitations as they provide safety against only splinters, rocks, and bullets that have ricocheted and grazed the helmets. The soldier will likely incur injury or lose his life if the bullet is hit directly on the helmet.  A crucial factor about the new helmets is they are bullet proof and can bear impact of 9 mm ammunition fired from a short distance. About 6000 of these helmets will go to the Indian Navy, and many of these helmets will be designed for integration with modern communication and night vision devices. These helmets are part of the modern military equipment that is designed to protect and improve the lethality of the soldiers engaged in counter-insurgency or counter terrorist operations.

Business 
Platform Armouring
MKU designs, manufactures and supplies ballistic kits to global forces for their tracked and off-road vehicles across ACVs (Armoured Combat Vehicles) & APCs (Armoured Personnel Carriers). These kits can be installed on platforms in real time in combat zones depending on the mission criticality and combat requirements, and often include standalone armours or add on armours, and spall liners.

Spall liners protect the soldiers in APCs from spall effect arising due to penetration of hull by high speed projectiles like anti-material rifles. Such spall effect delivers multiple impacts on the occupants by injuries from fragments arising due to breach of vehicle hull from anti-material rounds.

MKU has created armour panels for more than 20 types of helicopters including De Havilland DHC-6 Twin Otter, Pilatus PC-6 Turbo Porter, Bell UH-1/212 Huey-Types, Boeing CH-47, Eurocopter B0-105, Eurocopter Puma/Super Puma/Cougar, Sikorsky CH-53, Mil Mi-8/17, NH Industries NH-90. The company uses its German engineered patented system MODULARE SCHUTZ TECHNIK and Polyshield V6 technology to build up to 40 per cent lighter and thinner armour panels for different aircraft that protect the platform from small handguns, assault rifles, armour piercing ammunitions, fragments, and heavy machine guns. A reduced weight of the panels also translates into more useful payload and increases the endurance of the aircraft which means the pilot can have more crew and more ammunition or rations inside the aircraft. The products are in use on warships as well for e.g. armouring German-built warships in Turkey.

The Kanpur-based defence manufacturer also joined with French defence technology giant Thales Group to produce night vision devices in the country. The MoU was signed on the sidelines of India's largest defence exhibition organised Defence Expo2020 Lucknow, Uttar Pradesh in February this year.

MKU recently won a contract to supply 14,500 ballistic vest to the Policia Militar do Estado de Sao Paulo of Brazil. The MKU also supply Night vision device to the Brazilian Army.

References

Defence companies of India